KQRE-LD (channel 20) is a low-power television station in Bend, Oregon, United States, serving Central Oregon as an affiliate of the Spanish-language Telemundo network. It is owned by the News-Press & Gazette Company (NPG) alongside dual NBC/CW+ affiliate KTVZ (channel 21) and Class A Fox affiliate KFXO-CD (channel 39). The stations share studios on Northwest O. B. Riley Road in Bend, while KQRE-LD's transmitter is located on Grizzly Mountain northwest of Prineville, Oregon.

Although it identifies as a separate station in its own right, KQRE-LD is officially licensed as a translator of KFXO-CD.

Subchannels
The station's digital signal is multiplexed:

References

External links 
KTVZ

Telemundo network affiliates
Deschutes County, Oregon
News-Press & Gazette Company
QRE-LD
Television channels and stations established in 1982
1982 establishments in Oregon
QRE-LD
Low-power television stations in the United States